Ningxia Sports Lottery Continental Team is a Chinese UCI Continental cycling team established in 2014.

Team roster

Major results
2018
Stage 1 Tour of Qinghai Lake, Georgios Bouglas
Stage 2 Tour de Singkarak, Oleksandr Polivoda
2019
Stage 5 Tour of Qinghai Lake, Georgios Bouglas
Stage 7 Tour of Fuzhou, Alexei Shnyrko

References

External links

UCI Continental Teams (Asia)
Cycling teams established in 2014
Cycling teams based in China
2014 establishments in China